The men's 60 metres hurdles at the 2016 IAAF World Indoor Championships took place on March 19 and 20, 2016.

In the heats, Pascal Martinot-Lagarde was impressive, running a tenth of a second faster than his nearest rival.  Slightly slower in the semi-final, Omar McLeod and Jarret Eaton essentially equalled Martinot-Lagarde.

In the final, McLeod had a fantastic start, gaining half a metre by the first hurdle.  He never lost that gap and won standing up.  Eaton was also out fast, still dominated by McLeod but ahead of the rest, but the tall Martinot-Lagarde was gaining inches over each hurdle, with his teammate Dimitri Bascou doing very much the same.  They were three abreast over the final hurdle but Martinot-Lagarde's momentum put him ahead, diving over the line with Bascou just edging out Eaton, a metre ahead of the next best finishers.  For the second World Championships in a row, Martinot-Lagarde led a French 2-3 sweep of the silver and bronze medals.

Results

Heats
Qualification: First 2 (Q) and next 2 fastest (q) qualified for the semifinals.

Semifinals
Qualification: First 4 (Q) qualified directly for the final.

Final
The race was started on March 20 at 14:40.

References

60 metres hurdles
60 metres hurdles at the World Athletics Indoor Championships